William B. Oxley (birth registered fourth ¼ 1918 – 1985) was an English professional rugby league footballer who played in the 1940s and 1950s, and rugby league administrator of the 1960s, 1970s and 1980s. He played at club level for Barrow (two spells), Risedale Old Boys ARLFC, Rochdale Hornets (captain), and Ulverston ARLFC.

Background
Bill Oxley's birth was registered in Barrow-in-Furness district, Lancashire, World War II began four days after Bill Oxley had signed professionally for Barrow, he served with the Royal Horse Artillery in World War II for five years, and he died aged .

Playing career

Challenge Cup semi-Final appearances
Bill Oxley played in Barrow's 0-10 defeat by eventual winners Bradford Northern in the 1948–49 Challenge Cup semi-final during the 1948–49 season at Station Road, Swinton.

Club career
Bill Oxley scored one try for Barrow, it came in the 21-3 victory over Broughton Rangers at Craven Park, Barrow-in-Furness on Saturday 23 March 1946.

Managerial career

International honours
Bill Oxley was the England team manager for the 1975 Rugby League World Cup, alongside coach Alex Murphy.

References

External links

Search for "Oxley" at rugbyleagueproject.org
Man with the heart of an Ox
(archived by archive.is) Stan Ayres
Haven’s troubles strike a chord with Keith
(archived by archive.is) Barrow Island's brothers in arms
(archived by archive.is) Team of 1948
More Ulverston Rugby team taken about 1949- 50.

1918 births
1985 deaths
Barrow Raiders players
British Army personnel of World War II
England national rugby league team coaches
English rugby league coaches
English rugby league players
Rochdale Hornets captains
Rochdale Hornets players
Royal Horse Artillery soldiers
Rugby league players from Barrow-in-Furness
Military personnel from Lancashire